Coldwater Creek may refer to:

Coldwater Creek (clothing retailer)
Coldwater Creek (Missouri river tributary), a stream in St. Louis County, Missouri
Coldwater Creek (South Grand River tributary), a stream in Missouri and Kansas
Coldwater Creek (Saline Creek tributary), a stream in Ste. Genevieve County, Missouri
Cold Water Creek (Irish Buffalo Creek tributary), a stream in Cabarrus and Rowan Counties, North Carolina
Coldwater Creek (Oklahoma), a tributary of the Beaver River